Vodiško is a small settlement in the Municipality of Laško in eastern Slovenia. It lies in hills south of Laško above the left bank of the Savinja River. The area is part of the traditional region of Styria. It is now included with the rest of the municipality in the Savinja Statistical Region.

References

External links
Vodiško on Geopedia

Populated places in the Municipality of Laško